is a railway station in the town of Higashiura, Chita District, Aichi Prefecture, Japan, operated by Central Japan Railway Company (JR Tōkai).

Lines
Ogawa Station is served by the Taketoyo Line, and is located 3.1 kilometers from the starting point of the line at Ōbu Station.

Station layout
The station has two elevated opposed side platforms, with the station building located underneath. The station has automated ticket machines, TOICA automated turnstiles and is unattended.

Platforms

Adjacent stations

|-
!colspan=5|Central Japan Railway Company

Station history
Ogawa Station was opened on March 1, 1900, as a passenger station on the Japanese Government Railways (JGR). Freight operations commenced from April 1, 1903, and the station building was reconstructed at that time. The JGR became the Japan National Railway (JNR) after World War II. Freight operations were discontinued from November 15, 1975, and small parcel operations from February 1, 1984. With the privatization and dissolution of the JNR on April 1, 1987, the station came under the control of the  Central Japan Railway Company. Automatic turnstiles were installed in May 1992, and the TOICA system of magnetic fare cards was implemented in November 2006.

Station numbering was introduced to the Taketoyo Line in March 2018; Ogawa Station was assigned station number CE02.

Passenger statistics
In fiscal 2017, the station was used by an average of 1597 passengers daily (boarding passengers only).

Surrounding area
Aeon Mall Higashiura
Higashiura Town Hall

See also
 List of Railway Stations in Japan

References

External links

Railway stations in Japan opened in 1900
Railway stations in Aichi Prefecture
Taketoyo Line
Stations of Central Japan Railway Company
Higashiura, Aichi